Montgomery Township is one of the fifteen townships of Ashland County, Ohio, United States. As of the 2010 census the population was 2,700.

Geography
Located in the center of the county, it borders the following townships:
Orange Township - north
Jackson Township - northeast
Perry Township - east
Mohican Township - southeast corner
Vermillion Township - south
Mifflin Township - southwest corner
Milton Township - west
Clear Creek Township - northwest corner

Most of the city of Ashland, the county seat of Ashland County, is located in western Montgomery Township.

Name and history
Montgomery Township was organized in 1816.

Statewide, other Montgomery Townships are located in Marion and Wood counties.

Government
The township is governed by a three-member board of trustees, who are elected in November of odd-numbered years to a four-year term beginning on the following January 1. Two are elected in the year after the presidential election and one is elected in the year before it. There is also an elected township fiscal officer, who serves a four-year term beginning on April 1 of the year after the election, which is held in November of the year before the presidential election. Vacancies in the fiscal officership or on the board of trustees are filled by the remaining trustees.

References

External links
County website
Township Website

Townships in Ashland County, Ohio
1816 establishments in Ohio
Populated places established in 1816
Townships in Ohio